Year 242 (CCXLII) was a common year starting on Saturday (link will display the full calendar) of the Julian calendar. At the time, it was known as the Year of the Consulship of Gratus and Lepidus (or, less frequently, year 995 Ab urbe condita). The denomination 242 for this year has been used since the early medieval period, when the Anno Domini calendar era became the prevalent method in Europe for naming years.

Events

By place

Roman Empire 
 Emperor Gordian III begins a campaign against King Shapur I; Greek philosopher Plotinus joins him, hoping to obtain first-hand knowledge of Persian and Indian philosophies. 
 Gordian III evacuates the Cimmerian cities in the Bosphorus (Crimea), as the territory is now controlled by the Goths.

Persia 
 Shapur I makes a pre-emptive attack on Antioch to drive out the Romans. Gordian's father-in-law, Timesitheus, leads a Roman army to defeat the Sassanids at Carrhae and Nisibis.
 King Ardashir I, founder of the Sassanid Empire, dies after a 30-year reign. He is succeeded by his son and co-ruler Shapur I.

By topic

Religion 
 Patriarch Titus succeeds Eugenius I as Patriarch of Constantinople (until 272).
</onlyinclude>

Births 
 Saloninus, Roman emperor (d. 260)

Deaths 
 Ammonius Saccas, Egyptian philosopher (b. 175)
 Ardashir I, king of the Sassanid Empire (b. 180)
 Cao Hui, Chinese prince of the Cao Wei state
 Man Chong (or Boning), Chinese politician

References